Panthaya Kozhi is a Malayalam movie produced by Lal under the banner of Lal Creations. It is directed by M. A. Venu, who last did the critically acclaimed Chakoram in 1994. Narain pairs up with Pooja for the first time. Through in this movie, he's launched as a full-fledged action hero. Narain plays Nandhagopal, who comes to Kalimuthupalayam in Tamil Nadu to sell a house and some property, while Pooja plays Chembakam, a Tamil girl who falls in love with him, making her debut in Malayalam cinema. Geetha plays Narain's mother in the film. Telugu actor Rami Reddy appears as the villain Nachiappa Gounder, the cruel landlord and don of the Kalimuthupalayam village in his last Malayalam movie. The movie has five songs penned by Vayalar Sharatchandra Varma and composed by Alex Paul. Venugopal handles the camera for the film. The story is by M. A. Venu and the screenplay was by J. Pallasseri. The film flopped at the box office. The film was dubbed into Tamil under the same title.

Plot
Nandagopal lives with his mother  Madhavi and mute sister Maya at the mercy of his uncle. They learn that their late father bought a bungalow in Kalimuthupalayam, Tamil Nadu. Nandagopal goes there to sell the property in order to overcome their financial difficulties. But it's not easy to sell the bungalow because Nachiappa Gounder, the villain, refuses to vacate the house. Meanwhile, Nandu falls in love with Chembakam. This matter creates other problems. Nandu's friends decide to bring his mother and sister to stay in the house. When Madhavi comes and sees the house, she is shocked. For there is a story from the past that she remembers and that Nandagopal doesn't know. Finally Nandhu realises that Gounder's cruelty towards his family was only a part of enmity with roots in the past. The rest of the movie is about how Nandagopal confronts Nachiappa Gounder.

Cast 
 Narain as Nandhagopal/Nandhu
 Rami Reddy as Nachiappa Goundar
 Lal as Raghavan Nair
 Madhu as Abdu Ravuthar
 Pooja as Chempakam
 Geetha as Madhavi
 Remya Nambeesan as Maya
 Bose Venkat as CI Alex Antony
 Janardhanan as Sankaran Nair
 Rajan P. Dev as Jyotsar
 Cochin Haneefa as Parunthu Bhaskaran
 Sreejith Ravi
 Anil Murali as Anirudhan
 Sudheesh as Balu
 Indrans as Rajappan
 T. P. Madhavan as Settu
 Mala Aravindan as Chakrapani
 Abu Salim as Manikyam
 Manka Mahesh as Bhanumathi
 Ponnamma Babu
 Anoop Chandran

Songs 
 "Elakozhiyum"
Singers: Biju Narayanan, Sujatha
 "Karimpanayude"
Singers: Pradeep, Reju Joseph
 "Sankatathinu"
Singers: Ramesh Babu, Vineeth Sreenivasan
 "Sankatathinu"
Singers: Liji Francis, Sangeetha Francis
 "Sundariye"
Singers: Swetha, Vidhu Prathap

References

External links 
 MOVIE TRAILER
  MOVIE STILLS

2007 films
2000s Malayalam-language films
Indian action films
2000s masala films